Portrait of Alison was a 1955 British television series featuring Patrick Barr, Lockwood West, Anthony Nicholls and Brian Wilde. A crime-based thriller written by Francis Durbridge, it aired in six half-hour episodes between February and March 1955.

It is unknown if the live broadcasts were ever telerecorded. The series is missing from the archives.

Cast

Film version
A feature film Portrait of Alison based on the series was released in cinemas in 1956, starring Robert Beatty and Terry Moore. A similar cinematic release had followed a previous Durbridge serial The Broken Horseshoe in 1952.

References

External links 

BBC television dramas
Lost BBC episodes
Black-and-white British television shows
English-language television shows
1955 British television series debuts
1955 British television series endings
1950s British crime television series
1950s British drama television series